Sofiane Sylve (born 1976) is a French ballet dancer. She is currently a principal dancer and ballet master with the Dresden Semperoper Ballett, and the artistic advisor and school director of Ballet San Antonio, and is set to run the latter's new school. She was previously a principal dancer with Dutch National Ballet, New York City Ballet and San Francisco Ballet.

Biography
Sylve was born in Nice, France. She started ballet at the age of 4 and trained at Académie de Danse. After she was discovered at a competition, she joined the Badisches Staatstheater in Karlsruhe, Germany when she was 14. Shortly after that, Patricia Neary, a former New York City Ballet dancer and George Balanchine répétiteur, met Sylve and cast her as the lead in Allegro Brillante. Neary then recommended Sylve to join for Dutch National Ballet, which had more Balanchine repertoire. At age 17, she danced the title role in Cinderella. She was promoted to principal dancer and was offered a lifetime contract at age 20, and danced roles including Aurora in The Sleeping Beauty, as well as works by Balanchine and Frederick Ashton. In 2003, New York City Ballet invited Sylve to join the company, as Sylve had previously performed with the company as a guest dancer, she accepted the position after several months of consideration.

Sylve joined the San Francisco Ballet as a principal dancer in 2008. In 2020, Sylve joined Dresden Semperoper Ballett as principal dancer and ballet master. In 2020, she was also appointed Artistic Advisor of Ballet San Antonio. And as of 2022, Sylve became both Artistic Director of Ballet San Antonio and Director of the School of Ballet San Antonio.  

Sylve completed and received her Management Essentials and Leadership Principles certificates from the Harvard Business School Online.

References

French ballerinas
San Francisco Ballet principal dancers
New York City Ballet principal dancers
Dutch National Ballet principal dancers
Living people
People from Nice
French expatriates in the United States
French expatriates in the Netherlands
French expatriates in Germany
1976 births
Prima ballerinas
21st-century French ballet dancers
20th-century French ballet dancers